Team Lipton (UCI Code: LIP) was a women's professional road bicycle racing team and triathlon team based in the United States and races in elite events on the UCI Women's Road World Cup and USA Cycling National Racing Calendar. The cycling team's title sponsor was Lipton.

2007 team roster

Ages as of 1 January 2007.

Major wins

2006
1st Overall San Dimas Stage Race, Kristin Armstrong
1st Stage 1 San Dimas Stage Race, Kristin Armstrong
1st Stage 2 San Dimas Stage Race, Grace Fleury
1st Overall Tour of the Gila, Kristin Armstrong
1st Stages 2 & 5 Tour of the Gila, Kristin Armstrong
1st Stage 4 Joe Martin Stage Race, Kori Seehafer
1st Stage 8 Tour de l'Aude Cycliste Féminin, Grace Fleury
1st Overall Nature Valley Grand Prix, Kristin Armstrong
1st Stages 1 & 4 Nature Valley Grand Prix, Kristin Armstrong
1st Stage 3 Nature Valley Grand Prix, Laura Van Gilder
1st Overall Tour de Toona, Kristin Armstrong
1st Stage 3 Tour de Toona, Kristin Armstrong
1st Stage 6 Tour de Toona, Laura Van Gilder
1st Chris Thater Memorial Criterium, Laura Van Gilder
1st Overall Euregio Ladies Tour, Kristin Armstrong
1st Stage 1, Kristin Armstrong
1st Prologue & Stage 4 Vuelta Ciclista Femenina a el Salvador, Grace Fleury
2007
1st Overall San Dimas Stage Race, Meredith Miller
1st Stage 2, Meredith Miller
1st Stage 3, Lauren Franges
1st Lausanne, Kristin Armstrong
1st Overall Nature Valley Grand Prix, Kristin Armstrong
1st Stages 3, 5 & 6, Kristin Armstrong
1st Overall Tour de Toona, Kristin Armstrong
1st Stage 3, Kori Seehafer
1st Stage 5, Lauren Franges
1st Stage 6, Kristin Armstrong
1st Prologue Route de France Féminine, Kori Seehafer
1st Overall Green Mountain Stagerace, Kristen LaSasso
1st Overall Holland Ladies Tour, Kristin Armstrong
1st Stage 7, Kristin Armstrong

World and national champions
2006
 USA National Time Trial Championship, Kristin Armstrong
 USA National Time Trial Championship, Kristin Armstrong
 World Time Trial Championship, Kristin Armstrong
2007
 USA National Time Trial Championship, Kristin Armstrong

External links
 Official site

UCI Women's Teams
Defunct cycling teams based in the United States
Women's sports teams in the United States
Cycling teams established in 2006
Cycling teams disestablished in 2007